Viscount Loftus is a title that has been created three times in the Peerage of Ireland for members of the Anglo-Irish Loftus family. 

The first creation was for Adam Loftus on 10 May 1622, who served as Lord Chancellor of Ireland in 1619. This title became extinct in 1725 upon the death of the third viscount, who had no male heir, despite having married three times. 

The second creation was for Nicholas Loftus in 1756, a great-grandson of Adam and a member of the Irish House of Commons. Two of his sons were created earls as Earl of Ely, although both titles became extinct. 

The third creation of the title was for Charles Loftus in 1789, who became Marquess of Ely in 1800. This title is extant.

Viscounts Loftus; First creation (1622)
Adam Loftus, 1st Viscount Loftus (c. 1568–1643)
Edward Loftus, 2nd Viscount Loftus (c. 1598 - 11 April 1680)
Arthur Loftus, 3rd Viscount Loftus (18 June 1644 - 6 November 1725)

Viscounts Loftus; Second creation (1756)
Nicholas Loftus, 1st Viscount Loftus (c. 1687 - 31 December 1763) 
Nicholas Hume-Loftus, 2nd Viscount Loftus (1714 – 31 October 1766) (created Earl of Ely in 1766)
See Earl of Ely for succession to this creation.

Viscounts Loftus; Third creation (1789)
Charles Loftus, 1st Viscount Loftus (1738–1806) (created Marquess of Ely in 1800)
See Marquess of Ely for succession to this creation.

References

Viscountcies in the Peerage of Ireland
Loftus family
Noble titles created in 1622
Noble titles created in 1756
Noble titles created in 1789